Richard Herron (1890 – 19 September 1917) was an English footballer who played for Stoke.

Career
Herron was born in Durham and began his career with non-league West Stanley. He moved to Stoke in 1910 who at the time were playing in the Southern League and began a useful back up to first choice Bert Gadsden. He played in 20 matches in 1914–15 as Stoke won the Southern Football League Division Two title and were able to gain re-election to the Football League and Herron was tipped to become a fine goalkeeper. However, World War I was declared and Herron joined the Army. He was killed in action in France in 1917.

Career statistics

References

English footballers
Stoke City F.C. players
West Stanley F.C. players
1890 births
1917 deaths
Association football goalkeepers
British Army personnel of World War I
British military personnel killed in World War I
Sherwood Foresters soldiers
Military personnel from County Durham